Joseph (Joe) Schieser Nelson (April 12, 1937 – August 9, 2011) was an American ichthyologist. He is best known for the book Fishes of the World (1st edition 1976, 4th edition 2006), which is the standard reference in fish systematics and evolution. 

Nelson obtained his PhD from University of British Columbia in 1965. He retired in 2002 from the University of Alberta where he made most of his career; he continued to hold position as a Professor Emeritus and stayed scientifically active until his final years.

Outside academia, Nelson was a black belt in karate.

Legacy 
Species described by Nelson:

Species named after Nelson:

References 

1937 births
2011 deaths
Canadian biologists
University of British Columbia alumni
People from San Francisco
Academic staff of the University of Alberta
American ichthyologists
Scientists from California
Educators from California